Tay FM is an Independent Local Radio station serving Dundee, Perth and Tayside in Scotland. The station is owned by and operated by Bauer and forms part of the Hits Radio network.

As of December 2022, the station has a weekly audience of 122,000 listeners according to RAJAR.

History

Radio Tay commenced broadcasting on 17 October 1980 in Dundee and 14 November 1980 in Perth from studios at 6 North Isla Street in Dundee, near the city's Tannadice & Dens Park football stadia. The station originally broadcast each day from 6am to 8pm.

On 9 January 1995, the station split its frequencies into two to become Tay FM and Tay AM.

Both stations now also broadcast on DAB (Digital Audio Broadcasting – i.e. Digital Radio) and via their respective websites.

Tay FM broadcasts on a main transmitter in Angus on 102.8 MHz, with relays on 96.4 MHz in Perth and on the same frequency at the Tay Bridge. It is the more contemporary of the two stations.

Programming
Local programming is produced and broadcast from Radio Tay's Dundee studios from 6am-10am on weekdays and 6-9am on Saturdays.

Tay FM also airs networked programming from Clyde 1 in Clydebank, Forth 1 in Edinburgh and Hits Radio in Manchester.

News
Tay FM broadcasts local news bulletins hourly from 6am to 7pm on weekdays and from 7am to 1pm at weekends. Headlines are broadcast on the half-hour during weekday breakfast and drivetime shows, alongside sport and traffic bulletins.

National bulletins from Sky News Radio are carried overnight with bespoke networked Scottish bulletins at weekends, produced from Radio Clyde's newsroom in Clydebank.

See also 
 Tay 2
 Radio Tay

References

External links
 

Bauer Radio
Hits Radio
Radio stations in Dundee
Radio stations established in 1995